Erysimum caboverdeanum is a species of flowering plants of the family Brassicaceae. The species is endemic to Cape Verde. It is listed as a critically endangered plant by the IUCN. The species was first described by Auguste Chevalier in 1935 as Matthiola caboverdeana; it was placed into the genus Erysimum by Per Øgle Sunding in 1974. Its local name is cravo-brabo ("wild carnation"). It is used in traditional medicine.

Description
The plant is a small shrub, reaching around 60 cm height. Its narrow leaves are up to 4 cm long and 0.2 cm wide. 
The flowers are lilac colored, the fruits are very narrow, up to 6 cm long and stand upright.

Distribution and ecology
Erysimum caboverdeanum is restricted to the island of Fogo, where it occurs between 1,600 and 2,000 metres elevation.

References

caboverdeanum
Flora of Fogo, Cape Verde
Endemic flora of Cape Verde
Taxa named by Auguste Chevalier